1975 Emmy Awards may refer to:

 27th Primetime Emmy Awards, the 1975 Emmy Awards ceremony honoring primetime programming
 2nd Daytime Emmy Awards, the 1975 Emmy Awards ceremony honoring daytime programming
 3rd International Emmy Awards, the 1975 Emmy Awards ceremony honoring international programming

 
Emmy Award ceremonies by year